Wode is a surname. Notable people with the surname include:

 Peter Atte Wode (fl.  1325–1382), English judge
 Thomas Wode (died 1502), British judge
 Thomas Wode (MP) (by 1469–1532), English politician

See also
 WODE (disambiguation)
 Woad (disambiguation)